The Metropolitan Tract is an area of land in downtown Seattle owned by the University of Washington. The Metropolitan Tract is primarily located in a rectangle formed by Seneca St, Third Ave, Union St, and Sixth Ave.

History

The tract includes the original site of the University of Washington campus. In 1895 the university moved to its present site. Initially, the University's new law school used one of the old university buildings and the main, original building was leased first to Seattle Public Schools and then to the Seattle Public Library. As construction of commercial buildings began, this original building was moved a few blocks to a site along Fifth Avenue. However, the building fell into increasing disrepair, and an effort led by Edmond Meany to move it to the new campus and rehabilitate it was unsuccessful.

The state legislature had authorized the university regents to lease or sell the downtown tract. On December 9, 1902, the regents voted to lease rather than sell, although one strip on the northwest corner of the site was sold to the U.S. government for a federal building, on the assumption that this building would increase the value of the rest of the tract.

The initial 1902 lessee, the University Site Improvement Company, began construction on building for the Seattle Post-Intelligencer, but the lease was soon forfeited. Next, the land was leased on November 1, 1904 by James A. Moore, who completed the P-I building and oversaw the continuation of Fourth Avenue through the old campus. In 1907, the same year he opened the Moore Theatre and Hotel, Moore transferred the remaining 47 years of his lease to the Metropolitan Building Company who engaged the New York firm of Howells & Stokes to assemble a master plan for integrated development. Howells & Stokes intended to create a "city within a city." At the time, it was the largest development of a downtown site undertaken in the United States.

Howells & Stokes' design included a department store, offices, a hotel, housing and a small plaza, all to be built in a similar style and scale. All buildings in the tract were to be 11 stories tall, with terracotta ornamentation at the top and street levels and brick in-between. Their decoration would combine elements of the Beaux Arts and commercial (Chicago school) styles, such as symmetry and a clearly marked storefront.  Ten structures were proposed; of these, five were actually built.

Howells & Stokes employed Abraham H. Albertson in Seattle to be their local representative and oversee the construction. After the firm closed in 1917, Albertson and other former employees continued the project under the successor firm Howells & Albertson. As of 2007, the Cobb Building is the only one of the original buildings to survive.

The tract is managed and operated through two long-term leases: one with Legacy Hotels for The Fairmont Olympic Hotel and garage, and the other with UNICO Properties, Inc., for all the other buildings in the Tract.

Buildings of note in the Metropolitan Tract
The following buildings in the Metropolitan Tract are on the National Register of Historic Places
Cobb Building - 1305 Fourth Avenue, Seattle 98101
Fairmont Olympic Hotel - 411 University Street, Seattle 98101
Skinner Building - 1326 Fifth Avenue, Seattle 98101
5th Avenue Theatre - 1308 5th Ave, Seattle, WA 98101, in the Skinner Building

Other buildings of note in the Metropolitan Tract are:
Financial Center - 1215 Fourth Avenue, Seattle 98161
1200 Fifth - 1200 Fifth Avenue, Seattle 98101
Puget Sound Plaza - 1325 Fourth Avenue, Seattle 98101
Rainier Tower and Rainier Square - 1301 Fifth Avenue, Seattle 98101

Former buildings of the Metropolitan Tract include:
The Metropolitan Theatre
Seattle Ice Arena
White, Henry, Stuart buildings (similar to Cobb Building) - 410 University Street, Seattle (now Rainier Tower)

Development plans
The University of Washington announced plans to redevelop the Rainier Square shopping mall, adjacent to the Rainier Tower, at the expiration of the long-term lease signed with Unico Properties in 2014. The Rainier Square Tower, a 58-story mixed-use skyscraper, will replace the mall and include  of office space, 220 residential units, and a 165-room hotel.

Notes

Buildings and structures in Seattle
Geography of Seattle
Downtown Seattle
Chicago school architecture in Washington (state)